The Political Victory Fund (NRA-PVF) is the political action committee (PAC) of the National Rifle Association (NRA). The Fund contributes money to political campaigns of candidates endorsed by the NRA.

Chairman
Chris W. Cox, who has been the NRA's chief lobbyist and principal political strategist since 2002, is also the NRA-PVF chairman, and "has directed NRA’s electoral efforts at every level."

History

With passage of the Gun Control Act of 1968, an increasing number of NRA members, who has previously downplayed gun control issues, became more involved in gun politics and gun rights. Along with the creation of its lobbying arm, the Institute for Legislative Action (NRA-ILA), with activist Harlon Carter as director, in 1976 the NRA established its non-partisan political action committee (PAC), the Political Victory Fund, in time for the 1976 elections. 

The NRA-PVF endorsed Ronald Reagan in the 1980 presidential campaign, the first NRA presidential endorsement.

By 1998, the NRA-PVF ranked as "one of the biggest spenders in congressional elections".

In the 2004 elections, 95% of the NRA-PVF endorsed federal candidates and 86% of the endorsed state candidates were elected. 

By 2008, during the elections, the PVF spent millions "on direct campaign donations, independent campaign expenditures and on mobilizing the most aggressive grassroots operation in NRA history." In 2012, NRA-PVF income was $14.4 million and expenses were $16.1 million. By 2014, the NRA-PVF income rose to $21.9 million with expenses of $20.7 million.

Mandate
The NRA-PVF political action committee (PAC) was established in 1976 as a NRA subsidiary. The NRA-PVF created a rating system for political candidates to measure their support for gun-rights. It also helps its members locate an NRA Election Volunteer Coordinator (EVC) for their area and to register to vote.

Rating political candidates
Through the Political Victory Fund, the NRA began to rate political candidates "irrespective of party affiliation - based on voting records, and public statements" on their positions on gun rights on a point scale of A+ to F. An NRA "A+" candidate, such as Todd Tiahrt, is one who has "not only an excellent voting record on all critical NRA issues, but who has also made a vigorous effort to promote and defend the Second Amendment", whereas an NRA "F" candidate is a "true enemy of gun owners' rights". 

Mike Spies, who has been reporting on the gun lobby since 2015, wrote a series called "The Gunfighters", which investigated the influence of the National Rifle Association (NRA) on state gun policy and politics. In his March 17, 2016 article published in The Trace, Mike Spies described how the NRA began to use their scoring system to influence judicial nominations. The first attempt was during the confirmation proceedings of Supreme Court justice Sonia Sotomayor in 2009 at the request of Mitch McConnell and again in 2010 with Elena Kagan. In 2011, the NRA opposed Caitlin Halligan's nomination to the Court of Appeals for the D.C. Circuit and as a result, Senate Republicans blocked her confirmation. In 2016, the NRA opposed the nomination of Merrick Garland to the Supreme Court because he did not "respect the individual right to bear arms" - in 2007, Garland had "cast a vote in favor of allowing his court to review a crucial opinion by a three-judge panel that had found D.C.’s handgun ban unconstitutional." This article was cited in The Second Amendment and Gun Control: Freedom, Fear, and the American Constitution which presented both sides of the debate between those who "favour more gun controls and those who would prefer fewer of them."

References

National Rifle Association
Organizations established in 1978
1978 establishments in the United States